Schott Inlet is a small ice-filled inlet indenting the east side of Merz Peninsula close south of Cape Darlington, along the east coast of Palmer Land. Discovered and photographed from the air in December 1940 by the United States Antarctic Service (USAS). Charted in 1947 by a joint party consisting of members of the Ronne Antarctic Research Expedition (RARE) under Ronne and the Falkland Islands Dependencies Survey (FIDS). Named by the FIDS for Gerhard Schott, internationally known German oceanographer.

See also
Flagon Point

References

Inlets of Palmer Land